XHSCBU-FM is a community radio station on 106.7 FM in Xalatlaco, State of Mexico. The station is owned by the civil association Sueños de Vida Xalatlaquense, A.C.

History
Sueños de Vida Xalatlaquense filed for a community station on October 13, 2016. The station was approved on September 5, 2018 and signed on August 1, 2019.

References

Radio stations in the State of Mexico
Community radio stations in Mexico
Radio stations established in 2019